KFMX-FM (94.5 FM) is a radio station broadcasting a mainstream rock format. Licensed to Lubbock, Texas, United States. The station is currently owned by Townsquare Media.  Its studios and transmitter are located in south Lubbock.

History
Signed on as KLBK-FM in August 1966 with 100,000 watts. Station founded by Grayson Enterprises, Inc. as an automated station.  The KLBK (AM) announcers recorded announcements for the FM stations, and oversaw the tape players, and the TV engineers watched the transmitter and maintained its operation.

In 1970 the station added a small console and two turntables in a room used as an on the air studio. The format remains as general music, but added a live program each evening with "Music by Misty" hosted by Moda Fincher a.k.a. Misty.   In 1976 Chuck Spaugh left KSEL AM-FM and became general manager at KLBK-AM-FM. He changed formats to popular music, simulcasting some parts of KLBK(AM)'s day schedule, using the live studio equipment in the evenings, and the automation overnights.

In 1980 the station was sold to Southern Minnesota Broadcasting Company and the AM callsign changed to KSAX (AM), though the FM stayed as KLBK-FM. The studios were moved to 5613 Villa Drive and the FM letters changed to KFMX.   The station then moved to the 82nd & Quaker studios as part of Gulfstar Communications (later AM/FM, Inc, then Clear Channel Communications, then Gap Broadcasting, and currently Townsquare Media.)

KFMX call letters had also been used in Minneapolis, Seattle, San Diego, Omaha, and probably other markets. It has been on in Lubbock since January 18, 1981.

Format changed to Album Oriented Rock consulted by Burkhart-Abrams-Michaels-Douglas. Sign on program director was Bo Jagger (a.k.a. Ira Madsen) who'd worked at 92-K Dallas and KPAS El Paso. Jagger brought several air talents to town so that "FMX" had a bigger time sound than any previous Lubbock radio operation. Memos would task announcers with "interpret events, do not announce them" and "the magic of 'FMX is in the minds of those who operate her".

Over the years, the station has branded itself as  "94.5 KFMX-FM, The Home of Rock-N-Roll"; "Pure Rock, 94.5 FMX", "Absolute Rock, 94.5 FMX" and its current "Lubbock's Rock Station". The broadcast booth itself has often been referred to as "Voodoo Central", a name created by Mike Driver and adopted by the rest of the staff. FMX also served as the flagship radio station for Texas Tech Football from 1994-2008.

Mornings are currently hosted by "The RockShow" (Wes Nessman & Chrissy Covington). The RockShow has also been syndicated to Abilene, Texas and Wichita Falls, Texas.  The pair received immediate attention after developing a weekly stunt segment called, "Torture Tuesdays" that involved the announcers being beaten like pinatas and other painful and/or violent stunts. Previous hosts include The Heathen and the Late Kelly Plasker.

Notable broadcasters have worked at the station. Wes Nessman has been at the station on and off since the early-1980s; continuously since the mid 1990s. Dale Dudley and Loris Lowe worked at the station in the 1980s before moving to Austin where they work for KLBJ and KGSR. Brian King worked at the station in the 1970s under previous call letters KLBK. King is now a station owner (KEXX Llano, Tx among others). David Stewart hosted a talkshow on KFMX, and served as chief engineer in the 1980s. He spent many years at Tichenor Media/HBC before starting Moving Target Consulting Works. He is a partner in stations KPET (AM), KWFB (FM) & KXXN (FM). Mike Driver hosted the afternoon show on FMX for 25 years, ending on July 1, 2018. http://kfmx.com/goodbye-driver/

KFMX-FM transmits from an antenna shared with KLLL (FM), on a tower also used by KQBR, KZII, KAIQ, KKCL and KFYO's 95.1 FM (K236CP-FX). The Lubbock Tower was built by a consortium of stations (KFMX, KLLL, KQBR and KZII) in 1985.

References

External links
KFMX-FM official website

FMX-FM
Townsquare Media radio stations